La fiera is a Venezuelan telenovela written by Julio César Mármol and produced by Radio Caracas Television in 1978.

Doris Wells and José Bardina starred as the protagonists.

Cast
Doris Wells as Isabel Blanco
José Bardina as Daniel Meléndez
Carlos Márquez as Eleazar Meléndez
Tomás Henríquez as Atilio Zambrano
Romelia Agüero as La Chinga
Mary Soliani as Magdalena Melendez
Daniel Alvarado as Adrián
Lucio Bueno as Padre Elías
Luis Calderón as Sacerdote
Martha Carbillo as Rosa Blanco
Agustina Martín as Sara
Gustavo Rodríguez as Saúl
Argenis Chirivela as Abel
Eduardo Cortina as Brujo Tobias Jurado
Helianta Cruz as Dolores
Domingo Del Castillo as Jefe Civil
Verónica Doza as Juana
Pedro Durán as Policía Rafael
Mauricio González as Nieves
Elisa Stella as Ismenia
Orlando Urdaneta as Néstor
Cecilia Villarreal as Elena

Versions
Pura Sangre produced by RCTV in 1994 starring Lilibeth Morillo and Simón Pestana.
Piel salvaje written by Martín Hahn in 2015 for RCTV and starring Irene Esser and Carlos Felipe Álvarez.

References

External links

1978 telenovelas
RCTV telenovelas
Venezuelan telenovelas
1978 Venezuelan television series debuts
1979 Venezuelan television series endings
Spanish-language telenovelas
Television shows set in Venezuela